The Greater Good Science Center (GGSC) is a center located at the University of California, Berkeley.

Introduction 
The center was founded by Dacher Keltner in 2001, with a donation from UC Berkeley alumni Thomas and Ruth Hornaday following the death of their daughter from cancer. Based at the University of California, Berkeley, it sponsors scientific research into social and emotional well-being. The center draws upon academic fields such as psychology, sociology, education, economics, and neuroscience in its research. It publishes an online magazine, Greater Good; a podcast, The Science of Happiness; the Greater Good in Action website; and classes and events.

Podcasts and print magazine 
The center produces the podcast The Science of Happiness. Greater Good magazine (2004-2009) was a quarterly magazine published by the center, edited by Dacher Keltner, of the University of California, Berkeley, and journalist Jason Marsh.  The magazine highlighted scientific research into the roots of compassion, altruism, and empathy and included stories of compassion in action, providing a bridge between social scientists and parents, educators, community leaders, and policy makers. The magazine was nominated by the Utne Reader as one of the top independent publications in the country.

References

Notes

External links
Greater Good Science Center Website
Raising Happiness Blog: Science for Joyful Kids and Happier Parents
Greater Good Education Blog

University of California, Berkeley
Social psychology organizations
2001 establishments in California
Moral psychology
Positive psychology
Positive psychology journals